Murlikant Petkar is India's first Paralympic gold medalist. He won an individual gold medal in the 1972 Summer Paralympics, in Heidelberg, Germany. He set a world record in the 50 m freestyle swimming event, at 37.33 seconds.  In the same games he participated in javelin, precision javelin throw and slalom. He was a finalist in all three events. In 2018, he was awarded with the Padma Shri.

Biography
Murlikant Petkar was born on 1st November 1944 in Peth Islampur region of Sangli, Maharashtra. He was private or jawan of the craftsman rank in the Corps of Electronics and Mechanical Engineers (EME) in the Indian Army. He was disabled during the 1965 war against Pakistan, sustaining severe bullet wounds. Petkar was originally a boxer at EME, Secunderabad. After he was crippled he switched to swimming and other sports. He participated in table tennis at the 1968 Summer Paralympics and cleared the first round. He won four medals in swimming. He was later employed by TELCO in Pune.

See also
 India at the Paralympics
 India at the 1968 Summer Paralympics
 India at the 1972 Summer Paralympics

References

External links
 Petkar in EME

Indian male freestyle swimmers
Paralympic swimmers of India
Paralympic gold medalists for India
Medalists at the 1972 Summer Paralympics
Swimmers at the 1972 Summer Paralympics
Living people
Place of birth missing (living people)
Indian male boxers
Indian male athletes
Recipients of the Padma Shri in sports
Year of birth missing (living people)
Paralympic medalists in swimming